Paradise is the debut studio album by South African hip-hop artist A-Reece. It was released by Ambitiouz Entertainment on 21 October 2016. It features guest appearances from Emtee, P-Jay (member of hip hop duo B3nchMarQ and A-Reece's older brother) and  Amanda Black. Paradise topped the iTunes chart under 24 hours of release.

Singles 

The album's first single, "Couldn't" which features rapper Emtee, was released on 18 December 2015. The second single, "Mgani" (correctly spelt as "Mngani") which means friend in the Zulu language was released on 3 June 2016. The album's third single "Zimbali" was released on 13 September 2016. The fourth single "Sebenza", meaning "Work" in Zulu was released on 23 September 2016 accompanied by its music video, it features singer Amanda Black.

Content removal 
After departing from Ambitiouz Entertainment, the former label removed all of A-Reece's music videos from their YouTube channel. Millions of views were removed.

Track listing
Credits were adapted from the album's liner notes,

Notes
"Paradise", "Zimbali" and "Let Em' Know" contain uncredited vocals from Amanda Black

"Ama Hater" contains uncredited vocals from Sjava

"Boom" contains additional vocals from P-Jay

Release history

References

External links
Paradise on iTunes (ZA)

2016 debut albums
A-Reece albums
Ambitiouz Entertainment albums
Albums produced by Tweezy